The COCABA (Confederación Centroamericana de Baloncesto) championship is a regional basketball qualifying tournament and the first of four possible steps that Central American national teams have to participate in order to qualify for major international basketball competitions. 

The teams that place first, second or third (and sometimes fourth) in COCABA will move on to the Centrobasket Tournament which is a qualifier for the FIBA AmeriCup. Depending on their successes in the latter tournaments, they could qualify for the Summer Olympics or FIBA Basketball World Cup.

Men's tournament

Summaries

Performance by team

Participation details

Women's tournament

References

Additional Sources

External links
 2022 FIBA COCABA Women's Championship
 COCABA Interbasket (Archived)
 2013 Tournament (Archived)
 2009 Tournament (Archived, In Spanish)
 2007 Tournament
 2006 Tournament
 2004 Tournament
 1999 Tournament

 
COCABA Championship
Basketball competitions in Central America